Patrick Howell is a French Polynesian civil servant, politician, and former Cabinet Minister. He is a member of Tapura Huiraatira.

Howell trained as a dental surgeon and worked at the Teva I Uta medical center in the early 1980's before becoming head of dental hygiene services in French Polynesia. In 1993 he became director of public health. In the 1980's he campaigned against French nuclear testing and for the creation of a health register for test workers as part of the Tomite No Te Rai Hau ("Blue Skies Committee").

In May 1994 he was appointed Minister for the Environment and Scientific Research in the government of Gaston Flosse. In a cabinet reshuffle in June 1995 he became Minister of Employment, while retaining his Environment portfolio. In May 1996 he was appointed Minister of Health and Scientific Research, positions he held until September 2001.

In 2008 he was elected a municipal councillor in Punaauia.

In September 2014 he was appointed as Minister of Health and Solidarity in the government of Édouard Fritch. As he was a senior civil servant at the time, he had to wait at least six months before taking up his ministerial duties. In the intervening period his portfolios were managed by Vice-President Nuihau Laurey, and he was employed as a technical advisor in his office. He formally took office on 25 March 2015. In May 2015 he and five other Ministers were deemed to have resigned from the Tahoera'a after ceasing to attend their political council. In May 2015 he was appointed as one of the French Polynesian government's delegates to the newly-formed Nuclear Tests Information Commission, tasked with investigating the health and environmental impact of French nuclear testing. In October 2015 he established a health study of the inhabitants of Hao and Makemo, which were used as support bases for the tests.

In October 2016 he was selected as Tapura's candidate for French Polynesia's 3rd constituency in the 2017 French legislative election. He surrendered his ministerial portfolios in January 2017 so he could focus on the campaign. He led in the first round, but lost to Moetai Brotherson in the second.

References

Living people
Year of birth missing (living people)
French Polynesian civil servants
Tahoera'a Huiraatira politicians
Tapura Huiraatira politicians
Government ministers of French Polynesia
Health ministers of French Polynesia